Ismail Mohamed (born 16 March 1980 in Thinadhoo) is a Maldivian footballer. An attacking midfielder, he currently plays at the club level for VB Sports Club. He is also part of the Maldivian National Football Team.

A versatile player, Mohamed is considered one of the best left-footed players currently playing in the Maldives. He is noted for his pace, as well as his dribbling and crossing abilities.

Honours

Maldives
 SAFF Championship: 2008

External links

1980 births
Living people
Victory Sports Club players
Association football midfielders
Maldivian footballers
Maldives international footballers